Daniel Mark Alfei (born 23 February 1992) is a Welsh footballer who plays as a defender for Cymru South club Briton Ferry Llansawel.

Swansea City

On 8 January 2011, Alfei made his professional debut for Swansea City in a 4–0 victory against Colchester United in the FA Cup, where he was named man of the match. Alfei made his league debut a week later, as an 88th-minute substitute against Crystal Palace.
Alfei also played in Swansea's FA Cup fourth round tie against Leyton Orient in 2011. He signed a new three-year contract in April 2011.

On 9 May 2013, Alfei signed a new contract with Swansea until June 2016. Alfei was released in May 2016.

Wrexham loan

On transfer deadline day in January 2012 he signed for Conference National side Wrexham on a season long loan. He made his debut in a home win against Hayes & Yeading United where the Dragons won 4–1. He returned to Swansea at the end of the 2011–12 season. In October 2012 Alfei re-joined Wrexham on loan until January 2013. Wrexham extended Alfei's loan until the end of the 2012–2013 season.

Portsmouth loan

On 2 January 2014, Alfei joined League Two club Portsmouth on loan for one month. On 31 January 2014, Alfei's loan was extended until the end of the season.

Northampton Town loan

On 2 July 2014, Alfei signed for League Two club Northampton Town on a season long loan. Alfei made 14 appearances for Northampton before his loan was ended on 2 January 2015.

Mansfield Town loan

In February 2016, Alfei joined League Two club Mansfield Town on loan until the end of the season. Alfei went on to make 12 appearances for The Stags.

Aberystwyth Town
Alfei joined Aberystwyth Town on a free transfer in 2016. After making 18 appearances for them, Alfei was released at the end of the season.

Yeovil Town
On 28 July 2017, Alfei signed for League Two club Yeovil Town on a two-year contract. In only his fourth appearance for Yeovil, Alfei suffered a ruptured anterior cruciate ligament which ruled him out for the remainder of the 2017–18 season. He was released by Yeovil at the end of the 2017–18 season.

Llanelli Town
On 31 August 2018, Alfei signed for Welsh Premier League side Llanelli Town.

International career
Alfei represented and captained the Wales under-19 team and has played several times for the Wales under-21 team. In January 2013 he was selected in the Wales under 21 squad for the friendly match against Iceland on 6 February 2013.

Injuries saw Alfei called up for the Welsh senior side in October 2013, remaining on the bench in a 1–1 draw against Belgium.

Career statistics

References

External links

1992 births
Living people
Footballers from Swansea
Welsh footballers
Wales youth international footballers
Wales under-21 international footballers
Swansea City A.F.C. players
Wrexham A.F.C. players
Portsmouth F.C. players
Northampton Town F.C. players
Mansfield Town F.C. players
Aberystwyth Town F.C. players
Yeovil Town F.C. players
English Football League players
National League (English football) players
Cymru Premier players
Association football defenders
Haverfordwest County A.F.C. players
Llanelli Town A.F.C. players